PSB-CB5 (CID-85469571) is a compound which acts as an antagonist at the former orphan receptor GPR18, and is the first selective antagonist characterised for this receptor, with an IC50 of 279nM, and good selectivity over related receptors (over 36x selectivity vs CB1 and GPR55, and 14x vs CB2.) As all previously known antagonists for GPR18 also antagonise GPR55, it has been difficult to separate the effects of these two receptor targets, so the discovery of a selective GPR18 antagonist is expected to be useful in research into the actions of this receptor.

See also 
 CID-16020046
 O-1918

References 

Cannabinoids